Eric Carle (June 25, 1929 – May 23, 2021) was an American author, designer and illustrator of children's books. His picture book The Very Hungry Caterpillar, first published in 1969, has been translated into more than 66 languages and sold more than 50 million copies. His career as an illustrator and children's book author took off after he collaborated on Brown Bear, Brown Bear, What Do You See?. He illustrated more than 70 books, most of which he also wrote, and more than 145 million copies of his books have been sold around the world.

In 2003, the American Library Association awarded Carle the biennial Laura Ingalls Wilder Medal (now called the Children's Literature Legacy Award), a prize for writers or illustrators of children's books published in the U.S. who have made lasting contributions to the field. Carle was also a U.S. nominee for the biennial, international Hans Christian Andersen Award in 2010.

Early life

Carle was born on June 25, 1929, in Syracuse, New York, the son of Johanna (née Oelschlaeger) and Erich W. Carle, a civil servant. When he was six years old, his mother, homesick for Germany, led the family back to Stuttgart. He was educated there and graduated from the local art school, the State Academy of Fine Arts Stuttgart. His father was drafted into the German army at the beginning of World War II (1939) and taken prisoner by the Soviet forces when Germany capitulated in May 1945. He returned home in late 1947 weighing . Carle told The Guardian years later that his father was a broken man when he came back. He was a "sick man. Psychologically, physically devastated."

Carle was sent to the small town of Schwenningen to escape the bombings of Stuttgart. When he was 15, the German government conscripted boys of that age to dig trenches on the Siegfried Line. He did not care to think about it deeply and said his wife thought he suffered from post-traumatic stress.

Always homesick for the United States, he dreamed of returning home one day. He eventually made it to New York City in 1952 with only $40 in savings and landed a job as graphic designer in the promotion department of The New York Times. He was drafted into the U.S. Army during the Korean War and stationed in Germany with the 2nd Armoured Division as a mail clerk. After discharge he returned to his old job with The New York Times. Later he became the art director of an advertising agency.

Writing and illustrating career
Educator and author Bill Martin Jr. noticed the illustration of a red lobster Carle had created for an advertisement and asked him to collaborate on a picture book.

Brown Bear, Brown Bear, What Do You See? was published by Henry Holt & Co. in 1967 and became a best-seller. Thus began Carle's career as an illustrator, and soon he was writing and illustrating his own stories.

His artwork was created as collage, using hand-painted papers, which he cut and layered to form bright and colourful images. Many of his books have an added dimension—die-cut pages, twinkling lights as in The Very Lonely Firefly, even the lifelike sound of a cricket's song as in The Very Quiet Cricket. The themes of his stories are usually drawn from nature and inspired by the walks his father would take him on across meadows and through woods.

In his own words:

Personal life
For over 30 years, Carle and his second wife, Barbara Morrison, lived in Northampton, Massachusetts. He also owned a home in Key Largo, Florida. Carle had a son and a daughter.

With his second wife, he founded The Eric Carle Museum of Picture Book Art, a  museum devoted to the art of children's books in Amherst, adjacent to Hampshire College. According to the museum, it has had over 500,000 visitors, including more than 30,000 school children, since it opened its doors in 2002.

Carle received numerous honorary degrees from colleges and universities including Williams College in 2016, Smith College in 2014, Appalachian State University in 2013 and Bates College in 2007.

Google paid tribute to Carle and his book The Very Hungry Caterpillar by asking him to design the logo "Google doodle", introduced on its home page on March 20, 2009, celebrating the first day of spring.

Carle won numerous awards for his work in children's literature, including the Japan Picture Book Award, the Regina Medal and the Lifetime Achievement Award from the Society of Illustrators. In 2003, he received the Laura Ingalls Wilder Award (now called the Children's Literature Legacy Award), from the professional children's librarians, which recognizes an author or illustrator whose books, published in the United States, have made "a substantial and lasting contribution to literature for children". The committee cited his "visual observations of the natural world" and his innovative designs: "Taking the medium of collage to a new level, Carle creates books using luminous colors and playful designs often incorporating an interactive dimension, tactile or auditory discoveries, die-cut pages, foldouts, and other innovative uses of page space."

In a 2012 survey of School Library Journal readers, The Very Hungry Caterpillar was voted the number two children's picture book behind Maurice Sendak’s Where the Wild Things Are.

In 2019, a jumping spider mimicking a caterpillar was named in Carle's honor, to commemorate the 50th anniversary of the publication of The Very Hungry Caterpillar, and to celebrate his 90th birthday.

The Frist Art Museum exhibition "Eric Carle's Picture Books: Celebrating 50 Years of The Very Hungry Caterpillar" was on display from October 18, 2019, through February 23, 2020. In November 2019, Carle sold his publishing rights to Penguin Random House.

Death
Carle died on May 23, 2021, at his summer studio in Northampton, Massachusetts, from kidney failure, at the age of 91. An official announcement was made by his family on May 26, 2021, via their website.

Selected works
Eric Carle wrote over 70 books that sold over 170 million copies.
 1967, Brown Bear, Brown Bear, What Do You See? (illustrator)
 1968, 1, 2, 3 to the Zoo
 1969, The Very Hungry Caterpillar
 1970, Pancakes, Pancakes!
 1970, The Tiny Seed
 1970, Tales of the Nimipoo (illustrator)
 1970, The Boastful Fisherman (illustrator)
 1971, Feathered Ones and Furry (illustrator)
 1971, The Scarecrow Clock (illustrator)
 1971, Do You Want to Be My Friend?
 1972, Rooster's Off to See the World
 1972, The Secret Birthday Message
 1972, Walter the Baker
 1973, Do Bears Have Mothers Too? (illustrator)
 1973, Have You Seen My Cat?
 1973, I See a Song
 1974, Why Noah Chose the Dove (illustrator)
 1974, All About Arthur
 1975, The Hole in the Dike (illustrator)
 1975, The Mixed-Up Chameleon
 1977, The Grouchy Ladybug
 1981, The Honeybee and the Robber
 1982, Otter Nonsense (illustrator)
 1983, Chip Has Many Brothers (illustrator)
 1984, The Very Busy Spider
 1985, The Foolish Tortoise (illustrator)
 1985, The Greedy Python (illustrator)
 1985, The Mountain That Loved a Bird (illustrator)
 1986, Papa, Please Get the Moon for Me
 1986, All in a Day (Mitsumasa Anno editor)
 1987, A House for Hermit Crab
 1988, The Lamb and the Butterfly (illustrator)
 1988, The Rabbit and the Turtle
 1989, Animals, Animals
 1990, The Very Quiet Cricket
 1991, Polar Bear, Polar Bear, What Do You Hear? (illustrator)
 1991, Dragons, Dragons
 1992, Draw Me a Star
 1993, Today is Monday (illustrator)
 1994, My Apron
 1995, The Very Lonely Firefly
 1996, Little Cloud
 1997, From Head to Toe
 1998, Hello, Red Fox
 1999, The Very Clumsy Click Beetle
 2000, Does a Kangaroo Have a Mother, Too?
 2000, Dream Snow
 2002, "Slowly, Slowly, Slowly," Said the Sloth
 2003, Where Are You Going? To See My Friend!
 2003, Panda Bear, Panda Bear, What Do You See? (illustrator)
 2004, Mister Seahorse
 2005, 10 Little Rubber Ducks
 2007, Baby Bear, Baby Bear, What Do You See? (illustrator)
 2011, The Artist Who Painted a Blue Horse
 2013, Friends
 2015, The Nonsense Show

References

External links

 
 The Eric Carle Museum of Picture book Art
 
 
 
Interview with Eric Carle, All About Kids! TV Series #93 (1991)

 

1929 births
2021 deaths
Academy of Fine Arts Vienna alumni
American children's writers
American expatriates in Germany
American illustrators
American people of German descent
Artists from Syracuse, New York
Book designers
Deaths from kidney failure
German people of World War II
Laura Ingalls Wilder Medal winners
Military personnel from Syracuse, New York
Officers Crosses of the Order of Merit of the Federal Republic of Germany
Recipients of the Order of Merit of Baden-Württemberg
United States Army soldiers
Writers from Syracuse, New York